This is a list of moths of the family Saturniidae that are found in India. It also acts as an index to the species articles and forms part of the full List of moths of India.

Genus Actias
 Actias selene (Hübner, [1807])
 Actias maenas Doubleday, 1847 (= Actias ignescens Moore, 1877)

Genus Attacus
 Attacus atlas (Linnaeus, 1758)

Genus Archaeoattacus
 Archaeoattacus edwardsii (White, 1859)

Genus Samia
 Samia cynthia (Drury, 1773)
 Samia cynthia cynthia (Drury, 1773)
 Samia cynthia ricini (Boisduval, 1854) (taxonomy not yet resolved)

Genus Antheraea
 Antheraea pernyi roylei (Moore, 1859) (= Antheraea knyvetti Hampson, 1892)
 Antheraea paphia (Linnaeus, 1758)
 Antheraea helferi Moore, 1858–59
 Antheraea assamensis Helfer, 1837 (= Antheraea assama (Westwood, 1848))
 Antheraea andamana Moore, 1877
 Antheraea frithi Moore, 1858

Genus Saturnia
 Saturnia pyretorum (Westwood, [1847])
 Saturnia (Rinaca) anna - see Caligula anna (Moore, 1865)

Genus Neoris
 Neoris huttoni Moore, 1862
 Neoris huttoni huttoni Moore, 1862
 Neoris huttoni stoliczkana Felder, 1874
 Neoris zuleika (Hope, 1843)

Genus Caligula
 Caligula thibeta (Westwood, 1853)
 Caligula simla (Westwood, 1847)
 Caligula anna (Moore, 1865)
 Caligula grotei (Moore, 1858)
 Caligula lindia Moore, 1865
 Caligula cachara Moore, 1872

Genus Loepa
 Loepa katinka (Westwood, 1848)
 Loepa simplicia (Maassen & Weymer, 1872) (Note: this species is regarded as a synonym of Imbrasia dione according to LepIndex, this is an African species - further investigation as to what Hampson actually refers to is required)

Genus Rhodinia
 Rhodinia newara (Moore, 1872)

Genus Salassa
 Salassa lola (Westwood, 1847)
 Salassa royi (Elwes, 1887)

Genus Cricula
 Cricula trifenestrata (Heifer, 1837)
 Cricula drepanoides Moore, 1865

See also
Saturniidae
Moths
Lepidoptera
List of moths of India

References
 Hampson, G.F. et al. (1892–1937) Fauna of British India Including Ceylon and Burma - Moths. Vols. 1-5 cxix + 2813 p - 1295 figs - 1 table - 15 pl (12 in col.)
 Savela, Markku. Website on Lepidoptera and Some Other Life Forms - page on family Saturniidae (Accessed 8 July 2007).

 
x
M